Canegrate is a comune (municipality) in the Metropolitan City of Milan in the Italian region Lombardy, located about  northwest of Milan.

The town gave its name to the Canegrate culture, a prehistoric civilization whose main archaeological site has been excavated in the communal territory.

References

External links
 Official website
 Canegrate participatory budgeting

Cities and towns in Lombardy